The Deathhead Virgin is a 1974 American horror film directed by Norman Foster. It stars Jock Gaynor and Larry Ward (both of whom also produced the film and wrote the story and screenplay), as well as Diane McBain (who later called it "the stupidest screenplay I ever had to work with").

Cast
 Jock Gaynor as Larry Alden
 Larry Ward as Frank Cutter
 Diane McBain as Janice Cutter
 Vic Diaz as Mr. Capunan
 Kim Ramos as Moro Princess
 Manny Ojeda as Sebastian
 Iraida Arambulo as Maria
 Butz Aquino as Prof. Villarta
 Laurice Guillen

References

External links
The Deathhead Virgin at IMDb
The Deathhead Virgin at BFI
The Deathead Virgin at Letterbox DVD
Deathhead Virgin at Sinister Cinema

1974 films
1974 horror films
1974 independent films
American horror films
American independent films
Films directed by Norman Foster
Films scored by Richard LaSalle
Films set in the Philippines
Films shot in the Philippines
Treasure hunt films
Underwater action films
1970s American films